Manso I or II was the Prefect of Amalfi from 898 to 914. 

He succeeded, or may have deposed, Stephen, a relative of the first ruling family, and to whom he was unrelated. In 900, he associated his son Mastalus with him, following a practice that was to become widespread in the Mezzogiorno. He retired to the monastery of Saint Benedict of Nursia in Scala, leaving Amalfi to his son, the first judge.

References
Skinner, Patricia. Family Power in Southern Italy: The Duchy of Gaeta and its Neighbours, 850-1139. Cambridge University Press: 1995.
 

 

9th-century Italian nobility
10th-century Italian nobility